The Grandview Park Music Pavilion is a historic structure located in Sioux City, Iowa, United States.  The Monahan Post Band raised money in 1930 to build a modest music shell in the park.  Construction was already underway when the park's neighbors objected to the design.  The project was put on hold as the band raised more money and sought a more suitable design.  After President Franklin D. Roosevelt created the Civil Works Administration (CWA) in 1933, the city applied to have the new music shell included in Sioux City's projects.  Henry L. Kamphoefner, an unknown Sioux City architect at that time, drew up the plans for the structure.  The sculptural plaques on the front of the pavilion were designed by Herschel Elarth.  The CWA approved the project on February 26, 1934, as CWA Project Number 217.  The construction project required 52 tons of reinforcing steel, 4,200 bags of Portland cement, and 300 bags of white cement, and it was completed on October 17, 1934.  Seating was constructed for 5,000 in the natural amphitheater.  The pavilion was built using $47,436 from Federal Relief funds and $3,800 in materials from the city.  It was dedicated in the spring of 1935.  The Monahan Post Band continued to play here until 1948, when they became the Sioux City Municipal Band.  They continue the summer-time tradition.  The music pavilion was listed on the National Register of Historic Places in 2011.

References

Music venues completed in 1934
Moderne architecture in Iowa
Amphitheaters in Iowa
National Register of Historic Places in Sioux City, Iowa
Event venues on the National Register of Historic Places in Iowa
Civil Works Administration
Music venues in Iowa
1934 establishments in Iowa
Amphitheaters on the National Register of Historic Places